South Bimini Airport  is an airport in South Bimini on Bimini in the Bahamas. It was used as a staging point on the show Destination Truth.

Airlines and destinations

Passenger

See also
 The Fountain of Youth

References

External links
 fly-bahamas.com: airport information with picture and approach video

Airports in the Bahamas
Bimini